Mount & Blade II: Bannerlord is a strategy action role-playing video game developed and published by TaleWorlds Entertainment, and co-published by Prime Matter. It is a prequel to Mount & Blade: Warband, a stand-alone expansion for the 2008 game Mount & Blade. Bannerlord takes place 210 years before its predecessor, with a setting inspired by the Migration Period. Bannerlord was announced in 2012. A Steam page for the game was created in late 2015; the following year, TaleWorlds began releasing weekly developer diaries detailing elements of the game. An early access version of the game was released on March 27, 2020 and quickly became the largest launch of the year on Steam, achieving nearly 250,000 concurrent players on Steam. The game was released for Microsoft Windows, PlayStation 4, PlayStation 5, Xbox One, and Xbox Series X/S on October 25, 2022.

Gameplay

Mount & Blade II: Bannerlord is a strategy/action role-playing game. The fundamental gameplay premise is the same as previous entries in the series: the player builds up a party of soldiers and performs quests on an overhead campaign map, with battles being played out on battlefields that allow the player to personally engage in combat alongside their troops. Bannerlord, however, includes significant improvements to numerous elements of gameplay.

Sieges in Bannerlord are intended to be more strategic than they were in Warband. The player may construct a variety of different siege engines and strategically position them before the battle begins in order to target certain sections of the enemy fortifications. On the overhead campaign map, the player can choose to bombard the walls, possibly creating breaches that can be used once the battle begins. To discourage prolonged bombardments on the battle map, only the merlons, gatehouses, and siege engines are destructible during the actual battle. The design of the defending castles and cities is intended to be biased in favor of the defenders; for example, murder holes are often located at key chokepoints, allowing the defenders to slaughter large numbers of the attackers before they can breach the gates.

Bannerlord features numerous improvements to the relationships between characters. The player is able to use a more advanced dialogue system to try to persuade non-player characters to do things that they want. While conversing with a character, the player needs to fill up a progress bar by successfully pushing their arguments; if the bar is filled, the character will give in to the player. If the character does not give in to charm alone, the player can employ the game's bartering system to try to bribe the character; this system is also used for regular transactions between the player and merchants. If the player repeatedly fails to persuade the character, a deal may become impossible and the relationship between them may be negatively affected. The persuasion system can also be used to court and marry characters. While Warband allowed characters to marry, the player may also have children with their spouse in Bannerlord. If the player character dies, one of their children can inherit their soldiers and fiefs and become the new player character.

Bannerlord, like Warband, has a multiplayer component that allows players to engage in combat with each other across a variety of maps and game modes. As in Warband, the multiplayer of Bannerlord is restricted to battles and is separate from the campaign, although the developers have expressed interest in adding multiplayer to the campaign through post-release downloadable content. Bannerlord utilizes a class system that allows players to choose what type of soldier they want to play as. Classes are divided into three categories: infantry, ranged, and cavalry. Each class has positive and negative elements that are influenced by the positive and negative elements of their faction in general. Players select classes using a point system, which replaces the money system of Warband.

Story

Setting
Mount & Blade II: Bannerlord is set on the fictional continent of Calradia, 210 years before Mount & Blade: Warband, during the decline of the Calradic Empire and the formation of the predecessors of the factions that appear in Warband. The downfall of the Calradic Empire is analogous to the fall of the Roman Empire during the Migration Period and the formation of the Middle Eastern, North African, and European realms of the Early Middle Ages. The armour, clothes, weapons, and architecture of each faction are inspired by their real-world counterparts from 600 to 1100 A.D.

Factions
Bannerlord includes eight major factions or kingdoms, each composed of several clans and competing minor factions with their own goals. The Calradic Empire, based on Greece, Rome, and Byzantium, once owned a massive amount of Calradia, but has since been weakened by invasions from other peoples and the onset of a three-way civil war. The Northern Calradic faction believes that the senate should choose the emperor, the Southern Calradic faction believes that the widow of the most recent emperor should become the empress, and the Western Calradic faction believes that the military should choose the emperor. The Calradic factions all use a balance of heavy cavalry (including cataphracts), spearmen, and archers. The Vlandians are a feudal people that specialize in heavy cavalry; they are based on western European medieval kingdoms, particularly the Normans, Vandals and Goths. The Sturgians, located in the northern forests, specialize in infantry and are primarily inspired by the Vikings and Rus'. The Aserai of the southern desert are adept at both cavalry and infantry tactics and are based on the pre-Islamic Arabs. The Khuzaits, a nomadic people who inhabit the eastern steppe and specialize in mounted archery, are based upon the Huns, Pannonian Avars, Göktürks, Kipchaks, Khazars and Mongols. The Battanians inhabit the central woodlands of Calradia and are based on the Celts; they specialize in ambushes and guerilla warfare.

Development
In September 2012, TaleWorlds Entertainment announced that the game was in development and released a teaser trailer for it.

The game's graphics have been significantly improved from its predecessor, Mount & Blade: Warband, having better shading and higher detail models. The character animations are created utilizing motion capture technology and the facial animations were updated to improve upon the portrayal of emotions.

In March 2016, about 40 minutes of gameplay were shown at the PC Gamer Weekender event. In October of that year, TaleWorlds made a Bannerlord Steam page.

In June 2017, 13 minutes of gameplay were shown at E3 2017. That same year, TaleWorlds began releasing developer diaries on a weekly basis. These diaries give information about different aspects of the game. Previously, diaries had only been released a few times a year.

At Gamescom 2018, TaleWorlds presented a playable demo of the game and released a new trailer.

In a developer diary in 2019, TaleWorlds confirmed that they intend to have a closed beta for Bannerlord at some point in the future. However, no information about when the beta might take place was given.

On August 20, 2019, TaleWorlds published a trailer announcing plans for the release of an early access version of the game in March 2020. The game released in early access on March 27, 2020. Prime Matter, publisher and division of Plaion, signed an agreement with TaleWorlds to publish Bannerlord especially for physical copies on consoles. Bannerlord was released for Microsoft Windows, PlayStation 4, PlayStation 5, Xbox One, and Xbox Series X/S on October 25, 2022.

Reception
On its early access release, Bannerlord became the largest launch of the year to that point on Steam, achieving more than 170,000 concurrent players. Whilst still in early access, Chris Bratt, writing for Eurogamer, gave the game a largely positive review in an article entitled "Bannerlord is janky as hell, but I absolutely love it". He writes that "Bannerlord may not be finished and I suspect it won't be finished for a long time to come. It can be repetitive and unfair, many of its systems aren't up to scratch just yet and it's not uncommon to see the game crash or for you to run into some bizarre bug along the way. But at the same time, despite all of that, it is so much bloody fun." Fraser Brown for PC Gamer shares similar sentiments in an article subheaded "It's not finished, it's still janky, but it's brilliant all the same."

In a review for Kotaku, Ethan Gach echoes the incomplete, yet enjoyable gameplay. He writes: "The action is clunky, the world is ugly ... and since it's an early access game, it's still far from fully fleshed out. And yet after spending several hours with the game I've been thoroughly won over by it." IGN also gave the game a largely positive review. In their article, Leana Hafer writes that "for an early access game, it's ambitious and reasonably well-polished, even if it still has a long way to go."

References

External links

TaleWorlds games
Action role-playing video games
2022 video games
Early access video games
Strategy video games
Windows games
Open-world video games
PlayStation 4 games
PlayStation 5 games
Multiplayer online games
Video games developed in Turkey
Video game prequels
Video games set in castles
Xbox One games
Xbox Series X and Series S games